A Time for Killing is a 1967 Western film directed originally by Roger Corman but finished by Phil Karlson. Filmed in Panavision and Pathécolor, it stars Glenn Ford, George Hamilton, Inger Stevens, and Harrison Ford (credited as Harrison J. Ford) in his first credited film role.

It was also known as The Long Ride Home.

Plot
During the Civil War, Confederate soldiers escape from a Union prison and head for the Mexican border. Along the way, they kill a Union courier bearing the news that the war is over. Keeping the message a secret, the captain has his men go on and they soon find themselves in a battle with the Union search party who also is unaware of the war's end.

Cast
 Inger Stevens as Emily Biddle
 Glenn Ford as Maj. Tom Wolcott
 Paul Petersen as Blue Lake
 Timothy Carey as Billy Cat
 Kenneth Tobey as Sgt. Cleehan
 Richard X. Slattery as Cpl. Paddy Darling
 Harrison J. Ford as Lt Shaffer
 Kay E. Kuter as Owelson
 Dick Miller as Zollicoffer
 Emile Meyer as Col. Harries
 Marshall Reed as Stedner
 George Hamilton as Capt. Dorrit Bentley
 Max Baer Jr. as Sgt. Luther Liskell
 Todd Armstrong as Lt. 'Pru' Prudessing
 Harry Dean Stanton as Sgt. Dan Way

Production

Development
The film was based on a 1961 novel The Southern Blade. The Los Angeles Times called it "fast moving" The New York Times said it was full of "military stereotypes" but that it was written with "professional skill."

In October 1964 the screen rights to the novel were purchased by producer Harry Joe Brown. He set up the project at Columbia where he joined forces with Roger Corman.

Pre-production
By the end of 1964, Roger Corman was one of the most successful low-budget filmmakers in Hollywood, mostly working for American International Pictures. "Everything had been interesting, artistically satisfying, economically satisfying", Corman said eighteen months later. "But I decided I was going nowhere and wanted to move directly into the business." So he accepted a contract with Columbia.

Corman had a deal to make three films with Columbia. "But every idea I submitted was too strange, too weird", he later said. "Every idea they had seemed too ordinary to me. Ordinary pictures don't make money today [in 1966] because audiences today are too intelligent... It's a young people's audience... They can see the average for free on TV. You've got to give them something a little more complex artistically and intellectually. To show something you can't see on TV leads inevitably to unusual material."

Corman says the ideas he submitted to Columbia were a biopic of Baron von Richthofen, a story of the St Valentine's Day Massacre and an adaptation of Only Lovers Left Alive. (He would end up making the first two films for other studios).

Eventually he agreed on three films. The first was The Southern Blade, which he was to produce along with Harry Joe Brown. The others were  Iwo Jima (about the Battle of Iwo Jima) and Robert E. Lee, a biopic of the famous general. (Later Robert E. Lee would go to United Artists and the proposed third Columbia film would be a war film, The Day They Let the Prisoners Out, by Peter Bogdanovich.)

In June 1965 the title of The Southern Blade was change to The Long Way Home. Filming was meant to start in September 1965.

However, Columbia and Corman clashed and Corman wound up returning to AIP where he directed the hugely successful The Wild Angels. "The main difference between the minors and the majors is the amount of freedom allowed", Corman said. He and the studio came to terms once they agreed to give him a free hand with the script.

Corman had the script rewritten by Robert Towne with whom he had collaborated a number of times, most recently on The Tomb of Ligeia (1965).

Casting
In April 1966 Glenn Ford signed to star. The following month Cliff Robertson signed to co star. Eventually Robertson dropped out and was replaced by George Hamilton whose fee was a reported $100,000. Inger Stevens and Max Baer Jr also joined the cast.

Warren Beatty had been offered the lead role but turned it down. However he was impressed by Towne's writing, and later hired the writer to do uncredited work on the script for Bonnie and Clyde, which led to a long collaboration between the men.

The film was Harrison Ford's first film with a credited role; despite not having a middle name, he was billed as "Harrison J. Ford" (where the "J" did not stand for anything) to avoid confusion with the silent film actor of the same name.

Principal photography
Filming started in June 1966 in Kanab, Utah.

By the end of the month, Corman had left the project and been replaced by Phil Karlson. Columbia gave no reason for this decision. Once Corman left, his editor Monte Hellman also left the project.

Richard Devon, an actor who had worked with Corman, later argued the problem on the film was that Corman could not reconcile his low budget ways to work for a major studio.
He was given a fine budget and stars and everything else. But he started shooting the film and he just couldn't get out of his old ways. He was pushing the footage, he was pushing the actors, the crew was upset, everybody was upset, etc. The Columbia brass looked at the rushes and called him in and said: ‘You know. Roger, we want something to be on the film, We don’t need this fast kind of attitude that you’ve had in the past. There's a talent there, there's an ability. Stretch it out." But he couldn’t hack it. And he got replaced on the film.

Parts of the film were shot in Zion, Glen Canyon, Kanab movie fort, Paria, and the Coral Pink Sand Dunes in Utah. Filming also took place in Old Tucson, Arizona.

Soundtrack
The original score of the film was composed by Van Alexander who was given seven weeks to compose 45 minutes of music for the film. He collaborated with Ned Washington for a title song by Eddy Arnold.  Though producers Harry Joe Brown, Jonie Taps and Columbia's Mike Frankovich were enthusiastic about Alexander's score, once the film was met with a disastrous reception at a preview it was decided to restore the film with a guitar score by Mundell Lowe.

See also
 List of American films of 1967

References

External links
 
 
 
 
 

1967 Western (genre) films
1967 films
American Civil War films
Columbia Pictures films
1960s English-language films
Films directed by Phil Karlson
American Western (genre) films
Films directed by Roger Corman
Films based on American novels
Films based on Western (genre) novels
Films shot in Utah
Films shot in Tucson, Arizona
1960s American films